William Benyon may refer to:

Sir Bill Benyon (1930–2014), British politician, landowner and high sheriff
Billy Benyon (born 1945), English rugby league footballer

See also
William Beynon (disambiguation)